Belaoka Marovato is a commune in northern Madagascar. It belongs to the district of Andapa, which is a part of Sava Region. According to 2001 census the population of Belaoka Marovato was 8,463.

Only primary schooling is available in town. The majority 99.5% of the population are farmers.  The most important crop is rice, while other important products are pineapple, coffee and vanilla.  Services provide employment for 0.5% of the population.

References and notes 

Populated places in Sava Region